Derrin Hansen (born December 15, 1967) is an American college basketball coach who was most recently the head men's basketball coach at University of Nebraska Omaha. He became head coach after coach Kevin McKenna left to become an assistant at Creighton in July 2005. Hansen was named Summit League Coach of the Year in 2019, after leading the Mavericks to a Division I-program record 19 victories. On March 6, 2022, UNO athletic director Adrian Dowell decided to "make a change in leadership for the head coach position" after two straight 5-win seasons, dismissing Hansen after 17 seasons.

Early life
Hansen is a native of St. Paul, Nebraska and attended Nebraska Wesleyan University in Lincoln, Nebraska.

Head coaching record

References

External links
University of Nebraska Omaha Biography

1967 births
Living people
American men's basketball coaches
American men's basketball players
College men's basketball head coaches in the United States
High school basketball coaches in the United States
Junior college men's basketball coaches in the United States
Nebraska–Kearney Lopers men's basketball coaches
Nebraska Wesleyan Prairie Wolves men's basketball players
Omaha Mavericks men's basketball coaches